Tokyo Stories: A Literary Stroll is an anthology of Japanese short stories set in Tokyo. The translator and editor Lawrence Rogers won the Japan-U.S. Friendship Commission Prizes for the Translation of Japanese Literature from the Donald Keene Center of Japanese culture in 2004. The stories are ordered by the areas of Tokyo in which they take place.

Contents

Central Tokyo
 "Mire" by Motojiro Kaiji
 "Terrifying Tokyo" by Kyūsaku Yumeno
 "The Image" by Rintaro Takeda
 "Fountains in the rain" by Yukio Mishima
 "Meeting Again" by Kuniko Mukōda
 "Jacob's Tokyo Ladder" by Keizo Hino

Shitamachi
 "The Death Register" by Ryūnosuke Akutagawa
 "Kid Ume, the Silver Cat" by Yasunari Kawabata
 "The First Day of the Fair" by Rintaro Takeda
 "Elegy" by Ineko Sata 
 "The Old Part of Town" by Fumiko Hayashi
 "Fireworks" by Yukio Mishima
 "Azuma Bridge" by Kafū Nagai
 "An Unclaimed Body" by Michiko Ikeda

West of the Palace
 "From Behind the Study Door" by Natsume Sōseki
 "Firefly Tavern by Kazuko Saegusa
 "Swallows" by Takehiro Irokawa

The South End
 "Morning comes twice a day" by Mayumi Inaba

References 

2002 anthologies
Fiction anthologies
Japanese short stories
Tokyo in fiction